Ceratocystis oblonga is a plant-pathogenic saprobic fungal species first found in Africa, infecting Acacia mearnsii and Eucalyptus species.

References

Further reading
Heath, Ronald Natale, et al. "Insect associates of Ceratocystis albifundus and patterns of association in a native savanna ecosystem in South Africa."Environmental Entomology 38.2 (2009): 356-364.
Nkuekam, Gilbert Kamgan, Michael J. Wingfield, and Jolanda Roux. "Ceratocystis species, including two new taxa, from Eucalyptus trees in South Africa." Australasian Plant Pathology 42.3 (2013): 283–311.

External links

Fungal plant pathogens and diseases
Microascales
Fungi described in 2009